Rafael Suárez or Rafael Suarez could refer to:

Rafael Suárez (born 1972), Venezuelan-American fencer
Rafael Suárez (composer) (1929-1971), Venezuelan conductor and arranger
Ray Suarez (Rafael Suarez Jr., born 1957), American journalist